Three ships of the Royal Norwegian Navy have borne the name HNoMS Sel or Sæl (archaic spelling), after the Pinniped:

  was a  launched in 1901, she was sunk in action with the German Kriegsmarine during the 1940 Norwegian Campaign.
  was the former US Navy Elco-class boat PT-603, received as aid in 1951.
  was a  motor torpedo boat launched in 1963 and sold for scrapping in 1981.

Royal Norwegian Navy ship names